Lovisa Lennartsson (born 10 January 1998) is a Swedish footballer midfielder who plays for Kvarnsvedens IK.

External links 
 

1998 births
Living people
Swedish women's footballers
Damallsvenskan players
Women's association football midfielders
Elitettan players